The Ford Shelby Cobra is a concept car that Ford unveiled at the 2004 North American International Auto Show in Detroit, Michigan.  The Shelby Cobra concept is a roadster inspired by the original AC Cobra that AC Cars developed in 1961.

Development and design
Ford's Advanced Product Creation team designed and built the Shelby Cobra concept in five months. The project was led by Manfred Rumpel. Like several other Ford vehicles developed in the early 2000s (such as the GT40 concept, the GT and the fifth-generation Mustang), the Shelby Cobra concept is a modern interpretation of an older vehicle.

In the case of the Shelby Cobra, the design is reminiscent of the AC Cobra MkI. The first Cobra featured a large, high-performance Ford Windsor engine inside a small roadster that AC Cars had modified at Shelby's request. Likewise, the Shelby Cobra concept car is small and minimalist, eschewing conveniences found in most modern cars (such as air conditioning, a radio, anti-lock brakes, and even windshield wipers). In a press release to announce the debut of the concept car in 2004, Shelby echoed the aim of the design team: "That's the formula [...] It's a massive motor in a tiny, lightweight car."

Engine

The engine redlines at 6,800 rpm, and Ford claims it is capable of reaching , though the car is reportedly electronically limited to only . 

The double overhead cam cylinder heads and cylinders are fed by port fuel injection and racing-derived velocity stacks that are just visible within the hood scoop. For a low hood line, the throttles are a slide-plate design. The lubrication system is the dry-sump type, which relocates oil from underneath the engine to a remote tank.

Chassis
The chassis of the Shelby Cobra concept was based on an aluminum chassis used on the GT production car, and modified to suit the concept car's front-mid engine placement. In fact, many parts of the GT were adapted for use in the Cobra, such as the suspension, several components of the frame, and the mounting brackets for the transmission (which is placed in the rear on the Cobra). Despite sharing large portions of its chassis with the Ford GT, the Shelby Cobra concept is almost  shorter overall and has a wheelbase  shorter than the GT.

Body and interior
Although the Shelby Cobra concept was aimed to reflect the design of the AC Cobra, the concept is dimensionally very different from the original. However, the design includes many common external features, such as a large grille opening, side vents, and large wheel arches. In line with Carroll Shelby's designs, the concept has a very minimalist look, which is continued in the interior. The concept omits many features common in modern cars, such as air conditioning and a radio. The placement of the transmission in the rear allowed for the driver and passenger seats to be placed closer together, adding to the compactness of the Cobra.

The car appears in the 2005 film XXX: State of the Union

See also

AC Cobra
Carroll Shelby
Ford Motor Company

References

Shelby Cobra Concept
Rear-wheel-drive vehicles
Shelby vehicles